Geraniaceae is a family of flowering plants placed in the order Geraniales. The family name is derived from the genus Geranium. The family includes both the genus Geranium (the cranesbills, or true geraniums) and the garden plants called geraniums, which modern botany classifies as genus Pelargonium, along with other related genera.

The family comprises 830 species in five to seven genera. The largest genera are Geranium (430 species), Pelargonium (280 species) and Erodium (80 species).

Description

Geraniaceae are herbs or subshrubs. The Sarcocaulon are succulent, but other members of the family generally are not.

Leaves are usually lobed or otherwise divided, sometimes peltate, opposite or alternate and usually have stipules.

The flowers are generally regular, or symmetrical. They are hermaphroditic, actinomorphic (radially symmetrical, like in Geranium) or slightly zygomorphic (with a bilateral symmetry, like in Pelargonium). The calyx and the corolla are both pentamerous (with five lobes), petals are free while sepals are connate or united at the base. The androecium consists in two whorls of five stamens each, some of which can be unfertile; the pistil consists of five (less commonly three) merged carpels. The linear stigmas are free, and the ovary is superior.  The nectaries are localised at the bases of the antesepalous stamens and are formed by the receptacle. Pelargonium has only one nectary gland on the adaxial side of the flower. It is hidden in a tube-like cavity which is formed by the receptacle. Flower morphology is conserved within Geraniaceae, but there is a large diversity in floral architecture. Flowers are usually grouped in cymes (e.g. in Geranium), umbels (e.g. in Pelargonium) or, more rarely, spikes.

Geraniaceae are normally pollinated by insects, but self-pollination is not uncommon.

The fruit is a unique schizocarp made of five (or three) achenes, in the lower part the achenes are inside the calyx, while the upper part (the stylar beak) is the style of the flower, looking like a kind of long beak over the achenes. When the fruit is mature the style breaks into five (or three) hygroscopically active (ready to absorb water) bristles that curl, causing the achenes to be released.

Differences between the genera 
California lacks filaments without anthers (called staminodes), but the lower half of the five fertile stamens is made much wider by a wing with a rounded top on each side of the narrow higher part of the filament that carries an anther. Geranium only has ten fertile stamens without wings and lacks staminodes, except for G. pusillum that only has five stamens. Monsonia only has fifteen fertile stamens, which are merged at their base into a ring or merged at their base in trios with the middle filament longer than the others, except for M. brevirostrata with only five stamens. Erodium has five staminodes and five fertile stamens, without wings. Pelargonium has ten filaments without wings, between two and seven of which are topped by anthers, while the remaining three to eight are staminodes lacking anthers, but it can easily be distinguished by having only one narrow tube-like nectary inside what looks like the flowerstalk.

Taxonomy 
Geraniaceae and Francoaceae are the two families included in the order Geraniales under the Angiosperm Phylogeny Group (APG) classification (APG IV). There has been some uncertainty in the number of genera to be included. Stevens gives seven genera listed here, while Christenhusz and Byng state five genera.

Stevens also lists four synonyms of Geranium:
Geraniopsis Chrtek
Neurophyllodes (A. Gray) O. Degener 
Robertianum Picard
Robertiella

Hypseocharis, with between one and three species, which comes from the south-west Andean region of South America, is considered the sister to the rest of the family. Some authors separate Hyspeocharis as a monogeneric family Hypseocharitaceae, while older sources placed it in the Oxalidaceae. The genus Rhynchotheca has also been separated into the Vivianiaceae.

The Geraniaceae have a number of genetic features unique amongst angiosperms, including highly rearranged plastid genomes differing in gene content, order and expansion of the inverted repeat.

Phylogeny 
Recent comparison of DNA-fragments resulted in the following phylogenetic tree.

Distribution and habitat 

Most species are found in temperate or warm temperate regions, though some are tropical. Pelargonium has its centre for diversity in the Cape region in South Africa, where there is a striking vegetative and floral variation.

Gallery

References

Bibliography 

 
 
 
 
 
 
  Sandro Pignatti, Flora d'Italia, Edagricole, Bologna 1982. 
 Bakker, F.T., Culham, A., Hettiarachi, P., Touloumenidou, T., Gibby, M., 2004. Phylogeny of Pelargonium (Geraniaceae) based on DNA sequences from three genomes. Taxon 53, 17–28.

External links 
 Geraniaceae of Mongolia in FloraGREIF

 
Rosid families